The Trinity Court Building was a building in Lower Manhattan, New York City.

History 
The old building was torn down in 1926 to make way for a 24-story,  skyscraper. It was completed in 1927. One of the earliest tenants of the new building was a company managing miniature golf courses and a golf school.

Not long after its completion, the Irving Trust began started construction on the  Irving Trust Company Building at the corner of Wall Street and Broadway, visible from the Trinity Court Building. The builder commissioned a time study of the construction process. Eight images from that study have been preserved at the Canadian Centre for Architecture.

The building was demolished in 2015. It was built in place the Trinity Court Building (III).

References 

Buildings and structures completed in 1927
Former skyscrapers
Buildings and structures demolished in 2015
Financial District, Manhattan
Skyscraper office buildings in Manhattan
Demolished buildings and structures in Manhattan